TUT can refer to:
Tramways & Urban Transit magazine
Altaic languages (ISO 639 alpha-3, tut)
The Unquestionable Truth, 2005 Limp Bizkit album
The Unbelievable Truth, a comedy panel show on BBC radio
Tulip Television, a television station in Toyama, Japan

Universities
Tainan University of Technology, Taiwan, Republic of China
Taiyuan University of Technology, Shanxi, People's Republic of China
Tallinn University of Technology, Estonia
Tampere University of Technology, Finland
Tokyo University of Technology, Japan
Toyohashi University of Technology, Japan
Tshwane University of Technology, South Africa
Tsukuba University of Technology, Japan

See also
 Tut (disambiguation)